Faisal Iqbal may refer to:

 Faisal Iqbal (cricketer) (born 1981), Pakistani cricketer
 Faisal Iqbal (footballer) (born 1992), Pakistani footballer